UEM may refer to:

Unified Endpoint Management
University of Engineering & Management (UEM), Jaipur, India
University of Engineering & Management (UEM), Kolkata, India
 User environment management
 Universidade Eduardo Mondlane in Mozambique
 Universidade Estadual de Maringá in Paraná State, Brazil
 Union Européenne de Motocyclisme, the European Motorcycle Union
 UEM Group, formerly United Engineers Malaysia Berhad
 Kolej Yayasan UEM, a college in Malaysia